The United States first competed at the World Artistic Gymnastics Championships in 1958.  They only sent a men's team; they finished seventh.  In 1962 they sent both a men's team and a women's team; they finished sixth and eighth respectively.  In 1970 Cathy Rigby became the first American to win a medal at the World Championships, winning a silver on the balance beam. In 1978 Kurt Thomas and Marcia Frederick became the first Americans to win a gold medal at the World Championships.

Medalists

Medal tables

By gender

By event

Junior World medalists

See also 
 United States men's national artistic gymnastics team
 United States women's national artistic gymnastics team
 List of Olympic male artistic gymnasts for the United States
 List of Olympic female artistic gymnasts for the United States

References

World Artistic Gymnastics Championships
Gymnastics in the United States